Escherichia virus T3, also called bacteriophage T3 and T3 phage, is a bacteriophage capable of infecting susceptible bacterial cells, including strains of Escherichia coli. This phage is closely related to T7 phage in structure though the two viruses may differ in capsid maturation.

References

External links
 

Podoviridae